Pedro Mario Álvarez Abrante (born 2 February 1982), commonly known as Mario, is a Spanish retired professional footballer as a central defender.

Club career
Born in Santa Cruz de Tenerife, Canary Islands, Mario started his senior career with Atlético Madrid, but could only represent its C and B-teams. In summer 2001 he signed for Real Valladolid, making his La Liga debut in the 2001–02 season, playing in 17 games and repeating the feat the following campaign, still in the top flight.

In 2003–04, Mario was loaned to FC Barcelona, appearing only once for the Catalans officially, in an infamous 1–5 away defeat against Málaga CF on 3 December 2003. As Valladolid were relegated in June he returned to the Castile and León club for two further seasons, both spent in Segunda División.

Mario joined Recreativo de Huelva in 2006, being an important defensive element as the Andalusian side finished eighth in the top level, while scoring his fifth goal as a senior on 5 November 2006 in a last minute 2–1 home win over Gimnàstic de Tarragona.

For the 2007–08 season, Mario signed with Getafe CF, being an undisputed starter in his second year but appearing rarely the following campaigns due to constant injuries. His first appearance in 2010–11 – one of just three– only took place on 10 May 2011, in a 0–4 away loss against Real Madrid.

Mario also spent extended periods on the sidelines with his following team, Real Betis, with which he signed as a free agent in June 2011. He scored his first and only goal for the Verdiblancos on 24 February 2013 in a 3–0 home defeat of Málaga, but his team was eventually relegated and he left.

In late July 2013, Mario signed a two-year contract with Azerbaijan Premier League side Baku FC. After featuring regularly he moved back to Spain, penning a two-year deal with Real Zaragoza.

On 8 March 2016, after one and a half seasons in the second level, Mario moved to the Thai Premier League with Muangthong United FC.

Honours

Club
Muangthong United
Thai Premier League: 2016
Thai League Cup: 2016
Thailand Champions Cup: 2017

International
Spain U16
UEFA European Under-16 Championship: 1999

References

External links

1982 births
Living people
Spanish footballers
Footballers from Santa Cruz de Tenerife
Association football central defenders
La Liga players
Segunda División players
Segunda División B players
Atlético Madrid C players
Atlético Madrid B players
Real Valladolid players
FC Barcelona players
Recreativo de Huelva players
Getafe CF footballers
Real Betis players
Real Zaragoza players
Azerbaijan Premier League players
FC Baku players
Mario Abrante
Mario Abrante
Mario Abrante
Liga MX players
Atlético San Luis footballers
Spain youth international footballers
Spain under-21 international footballers
Spanish expatriate footballers
Expatriate footballers in Azerbaijan
Expatriate footballers in Thailand
Expatriate footballers in Mexico
Spanish expatriate sportspeople in Azerbaijan
Spanish expatriate sportspeople in Thailand
Spanish expatriate sportspeople in Mexico